Sorcin is a protein that in humans is encoded by the SRI gene.

Interactions 

SRI (gene) has been shown to interact with Ryanodine receptor 2, ANXA7 and GCA.

References

Further reading 

 
 
 
 
 
 
 
 
 
 
 
 
 
 
 
 
 

Penta-EF-hand proteins